Atarud (also Romanized as Ātarūd) is a village in Otaqvar Rural District, Otaqvar District, Langarud County, Gilan Province, Iran. At the 2006 census, its population was 129, in 28 families.

References 

Populated places in Langarud County